The minute tryonia scientific name Tryonia ericae, is a species of very small or minute freshwater snail with a gill and an operculum, an aquatic gastropod mollusk in the family Hydrobiidae. This species is endemic to the United States.

References

Endemic fauna of the United States
Tryonia
Gastropods described in 1987
Taxonomy articles created by Polbot